Mikhail Ivanovich Bondarenko (1901–1943) was an artillerist of the Soviet Army during World War II. He was given the title  Hero of the Soviet Union posthumously.

References 

1901 births
1943 deaths
People from Belgorod Oblast
People from Valuysky Uyezd
Soviet military personnel killed in World War II
Heroes of the Soviet Union
Recipients of the Order of Lenin
Recipients of the Medal "For Courage" (Russia)